Charlotte "Loo" Hardy (born Charlotte Noa; 11 January 1898 – 23 April 1938) was a German film actress of the silent era. She later emigrated to England where she died by suicide from an overdose of  narcotics.

Death
Noa's body was found in her flat in Cleveland Square, Paddington. An inquest was held on 26 April 1938, which referred to her as Mrs Charlotte Levi. The Coroner found that she had been overdrawn at the bank, was behind on payments of rent, had received a final demand for income tax, and tradesmen were refusing to supply goods unless for cash; and that she had killed herself by narcotic poisoning.

Selected filmography
 The Clan (1920)
 Catherine the Great (1920)
 Wibbel the Tailor (1920)
 Berlin W. (1920)
 The Voice (1920)
 Jim Cowrey is Dead (1921)
 Raid (1921)
 The Story of a Maid (1921)
 Miss Beryll (1921)
 Yellow Star (1922)
 The Enchantress (1924)
 The Old Ballroom (1925) 
 The Eighteen Year Old (1927)
 Road to Rio (1931)

References

Bibliography
 Weniger, Kay. 'Es wird im Leben dir mehr genommen als gegeben ...' Lexikon der aus Deutschland und Österreich emigrierten Filmschaffenden 1933 bis 1945. ACABUS Verlag, 2011.

External links

1898 births
1938 deaths
German silent film actresses
Actresses from Berlin
German film actresses
German emigrants to England
20th-century German actresses
1938 suicides
Suicides in Westminster
Drug-related suicides in England